U-High may refer to:

 Louisiana State University Laboratory School
 University of Chicago Laboratory Schools